Ceramica Flaminia was a professional continental cycling team based in Italy that participated in UCI Continental Circuits races and when selected as a wildcard to UCI ProTour events. The team was managed by Massimo Podenzana, with assistance from directeur sportif Simone Borgheresi.

It was sponsored by Ceramica Flaminia, an Italian tile manufacturer. The company returned to cycling sponsorship in 2013 with a new development team, .

Major wins

2004
 Trofeo Giacomo Matteotti, Stefano Boggia
 Tour du Finistère, Daniele Balestri
 Giro Colline del Chianti, Krzysztof Szczawiński
2005
 Stage 5 Course de la Solidarité Olympique, Maurizio Varini
 Giro del Medio Brenta, Manuele Spadi
2006
 Memorial Oleg Dyachenko, Aleksandr Kuschynski
 Gran Premio Nobili Rubinetterie, Paolo Longo Borghini
2007
  National Road Championships Road race, Tomasz Marczyński
 Giro del Medio Brenta, Adriano Angeloni
2008
  Overall Volta ao Distrito de Santarem,  Maurizio Biondo
Stage 3,  Maurizio Biondo
 GP de la Ville de Rennes, Mikhaylo Khalilov
 Stage 4 Circuit de la Sarthe, Mikhaylo Khalilov
 Stage 4 Vuelta a Asturias, Tomasz Marczyński
  National Road Championships Road race, Filippo Simeoni
 Gran Premio Industria e Commercio di Prato, Mikhaylo Khalilov
 Memorial Cimurri, Mikhaylo Khalilov
 Coppa Sabatini, Mikhaylo Khalilov
2009
 Stage 1 Circuit de la Sarthe, Enrico Rossi
 Ronde van Drenthe,  Maurizio Biondo
  Overall Brixia Tour, Giampaolo Caruso
Stages 2, 3 & 5, Giampaolo Caruso
2010
 Stages 3 & 5 Settimana Lombarda, Riccardo Riccò
 Dwars door Drenthe, Enrico Rossi
 Stage 2 Giro del Trentino, Riccardo Riccò
  National Road Championships Time trial, Raivis Belohvoščiks
  Overall Tour of Austria, Riccardo Riccò
Stage 2 & 4, Riccardo Riccò

Team roster

As of 1 January 2010

References

National champions
2007
  Polish Road race champion, Tomasz Marczyński
2008
  Italian Road race champion, Filippo Simeoni
2010
  Latvian time trial champion, Raivis Belohvoščiks

External links
 Official Site (Italian)

Defunct cycling teams based in Italy
Cycling teams based in Italy
Cycling teams established in 2004
Cycling teams disestablished in 2010